From the conoid tubercle an oblique ridge, the trapezoid line (or trapezoid ridge, or oblique), runs forward and lateralward, and affords attachment to the trapezoid ligament on inferior surface of clavicle

References

Clavicle